Balacra flava is a moth of the family Erebidae. It was described by Lukasz Przybylowicz in 2013. It is found in Cameroon.

References

Balacra
Moths described in 2013
Erebid moths of Africa